Alter Ego is a 2007 film produced by Village Roadshow Films (Greece). It premiered on May 10, 2007 in Greek theaters. The film stars Sakis Rouvas in his film debut. The film's soundtrack, which includes 5 songs by Sakis Rouvas.

Plot summary
Stefanos is the frontman, guitarist, and soul of the incredibly popular rock band Alter Ego. In recent years, the band has had groundbreaking success, and their potential surpasses those of international standards. However, a twist of fate changes their path on their journey to fortune and fame, and the group is ultimately rocked by a heartbreaking tragedy, especially Stefanos who needs to find the will and determination to move on.

Cast
Sakis Rouvas - Stefanos
Danae Skiadi - Ariadne
Doretta Papadimitriou - Nefele
Kostis Kallivretakis - Philippos
Dimitris Kouroubalis - Timos
Alexandros Logothetis - Argyris
Laertis Malkotsis - Andreas
Evdokia Statiri - Nadia
Mairi Louisi - Roula
Joseph King  - Himself

DVD release
The film was released on DVD in December 2007 in Greece. The DVD contains both English subtitles and Greek for the hearing-impaired. It also includes many behind-the-scenes features of Sakis Rouvas and the rest of the cast.

Box office
The film sold an estimated number of more than 250,000 cinema tickets.

Soundtrack
Alter Ego (soundtrack)

External links
 
 

2007 films
Greek romantic drama films
Films set in Greece
Sakis Rouvas